William Aaron Thompson (born October 22, 1990) is an American soccer player who most recently played for Puerto Rico FC in the North American Soccer League.

Career

Youth & College
Thompson played five years of college soccer at Loyola Marymount University including a red-shirted year in 2009.

While at college. Thompson appeared for USL PDL sides Des Moines Menace, Pali Blues and FC Tucson. After graduating, Thompson also spent 2014 with FC Tucson, where he won 2014 PDL Goalkeeper of the Year.

Professional
Thompson signed with United Soccer League club Orange County Blues on March 20, 2015.

Colorado Springs Switchbacks
Thompson moved to Colorado Springs Switchbacks on January 28, 2016. Thompson made his debut for the Colorado Springs Switchbacks in a 2-1 friendly victory over Air Force Academy Soccer team.

Puerto Rico FC
On March 2, 2017, Thompson signed with North American Soccer League side Puerto Rico FC. He was released at the end of the 2017 season.

References

1990 births
Living people
American soccer players
Loyola Marymount Lions men's soccer players
Des Moines Menace players
OC Pateadores Blues players
FC Tucson players
Orange County SC players
Colorado Springs Switchbacks FC players
Puerto Rico FC players
Association football goalkeepers
Soccer players from California
USL League Two players
USL Championship players
Sportspeople from Orange, California
Bayamón FC players